, born 　on November 26, 1975 is a Zainichi Korean reggae artist. She is signed to Sony Music Japan's Ki/oon Records division.

She began performing in the Kansai reggae scene in 1995. In 1998, she contributed back-up vocals for the Refugee Camp's "It's Too Late", a Carole King cover. After being signed to Sony Music Japan, she recorded and released her first single, "Brand New Day" on June 19, 1999 to much critical acclaim. In September 1999, she released her second single "Strong Woman", which was also a commercial success. The following spring, her debut album Say Greetings was released, having been recorded in Jamaica the previous year. She performed at Reggae Sumfest in 2003. Her 2006 album Sing A Song... Lighter! featured Luciano on one track. She has regularly visited Jamaica to record, and in 2007, she recorded in Jamaica with musicians including Sly & Robbie.

In 2010 she was nominated for the 'Best Reggae Video' award at the MTV Video Music Awards (VMA) Japan.

Her younger sister, Youngshim, is also a reggae musician in the Osaka area.

Discography

Extended plays

Studio albums

Singles 

 [1999.06.19] Brand New Day
 [1999.10.01] STRONG WOMAN
 [2000.02.02] GREETINGS!
 [2000.05.03] Fruit Moon (Kajitsu no Gatsu/ 果実の月)
 [2000.10.12] SET ME FREE (feat. DJ Premier)
 [2001.04.25] heavenly
 [2001.06.20] Music Is Mystic (feat. BOXER KID)
 [2002.08.07] FOREVER
 [2003.02.05] I Wanna Know You
 [2003.04.23] DANCE HALLIC
 [2004.01.07] Like a sunshine, my memory
 [2004.06.16] SOLDIER
 [2004.07.22] a song dedicated
 [2005.07.27] Anything For You
 [2006.07.05] I pray
 [2006.10.04] I Say Yeah!
 [2007.08.22] HEY BOY
 [2008.07.02] RAINBOW
 [2008.10.22] Renaissance
 [2009.09.23] My Endless Love
 [2012.10.10] Setting Sun
 [2013.03.13] HEAT (feat. Ego-Wrappin')
 [2014.06.04] Light Up Your Fire
 [2015.12.14] Feel It
 [2016.01.13] People In The Shadow

References

External links 
 PUSHIM's official homepage
 Sony Music Online Japan PUSHIM's page on her label's website
 https://www.sonymusic.com/

Japanese reggae musicians
1975 births
Ki/oon Music artists
Living people
21st-century Japanese singers
21st-century Japanese women singers
Zainichi Korean people